Live Maria Roggen (born 22 March 1970) is a Norwegian jazz singer, songwriter and composer.

Roggen was born in Oslo and educated at Foss High School (violin and vocals). She studied sociology and Musicology intermediate at the University of Oslo and Jazz Line at Trøndelag Conservatory of Music (NTNU) (1995–1998). She worked as a jazz and singing teacher at the Sund folkehøgskole, Høgskolen in Agder (music conservatory) and at Trøndelag Conservatory of Music (NTNU). Since 2006, Associate Professor, and since 2012 has been Professor of jazz singing at the Norwegian Academy of Music. She is the older sister of the twin sisters Ane Carmen and Ida Roggen from the Norwegian vocal band Pitsj.

Career 
Roggen first appeared in the duo Tu'Ba with the tuba player Lars Andreas Haug 1994. She helped start the band Wibutee in 1997–2000, and then was the lead singer of the Norwegian jazz band Come Shine 1998–2004. In 2003–2008, she appeared with their own lyrics and compositions in the Live Band. In 2007, a solo disc Circuit songs which won Spellemannprisen the Norwegian Grammy Award in the Open class.

Since 2004, Roggen has been co-singer and one of the driving forces of the improvisational vocal ensemble Trondheim Voices, for whom she made the compositions. In 2009, Roggen and pianist Helge Lien formed the Norwegian-language duo Live/Lien that performs original music written to texts by Norwegian poets, cover songs and jazz tunes.

In addition to her own bands and groups Roggen have sung with, among other Trondheim Jazz Orchestra, the Norwegian Radio Orchestra, Trondheimsolistene, Bugge Wesseltoft, Tom Steinar Lund & Trio de Janeiro, deLillos and Leieboerne, and she has since 1996 been a backup singer in the group Young Neils. In 2008 and 2009 she participated in four tribute concerts For Radka together with Arild Andersen, Jon Eberson and Jon Christensen, including in the Norwegian National Opera. In 2006–2009 she sang the tango and jazz compositions in the Atle Sponberg and Frode Haltli s La Fuente. She participated in children's records Magiske kroker & hemmeligheter (Egmont 2008) and Go'natt (Jazzland/Universal 2009).

Honors 
1999: The Norwegian State Scholarship
2003: Spellemannprisen 2002 with Come Shine in the class Jazz
2003: Kongsberg Jazz Award
2003: Radka Toneff Memorial Prize 2003
2004: The Gammleng Prize, in the class Jazz
2005–2007: The Norwegian State Scholarship
2007: Spellemannprisen, in the Open class for record Circuit Songs

Discography

Solo albums 
 2007: Circuit Songs (Jazzland)
 2016: Apokaluptein (Kirkelig Kulturverksted), commissioned work for the 2016 Vossajazz

LiveLien 
 2011: Låvesalg (Jazzland/Universal)
 2016: YOU (Ozella)

Collaborations 
 1998: Tu'Ba (Curling Legs), with Tu'Ba
 1999: Newborn Thing (Jazzland), with Wibutee
 2001: Come Shine (Curling Legs), with Come Shine
 2002: Pöck (Bergland Productions), with Dingobats
 2002: Denne lille pytten er et hav (Curling Legs), with Sverre Gjørvad
 2002: Do Do That Voodoo (Curling Legs), with Come Shine
 2003: In Concert (Curling Legs), with Come Shine
 2007: Følg oss hjem, Ole Paus (Kirkelig Kulturverksted), with Leieboerne
 2008: Magiske Kroker Og Hemmeligheter (Egmont), with Various artists
 2009: Go' natt (Jazzland), with Various artists
 2010: Improvoicing (MNJ Records), with Trondheim Voices
 2015: Red and Gold (Jazzland), with Come Shine

References

External links 

 Come Shine on Facebook
 www.trondheimvoices.comDead link, Nov. 2013
Biografi fra Norsk Musikkinformasjon

}

}

Norwegian women jazz singers
Norwegian jazz composers
Spellemannprisen winners
Norwegian University of Science and Technology alumni
Musicians from Oslo
1970 births
Living people
20th-century Norwegian women singers
20th-century Norwegian singers
21st-century Norwegian women singers
21st-century Norwegian singers
Trondheim Voices members
Come Shine members
Jazzland Recordings (1997) artists